Azadtappeh (also Romanized as Āzādtappeh) is a village in Shirang Rural District, Kamalan District, Aliabad County, Golestan Province, Iran. At the 2006 census, its population was 1,717, in 378 families.

References 

Populated places in Aliabad County